César de Bourbon, Légitimé de France (3 June 1594 – 22 October 1665) was the illegitimate son of Henry IV of France and his mistress Gabrielle d'Estrées, and founder of the House of Bourbon-Vendome. He held the titles of 1st Duke of Vendôme, 2nd Duke of Beaufort and 2nd Duke of Étampes, but is also simply known as César de Vendôme. Through his daughter, Élisabeth de Bourbon, César was a great-great-great-grandfather of Louis XV of France.

Biography

Born at the Château de Coucy in the Picardy region of France; his parents had started their affair in 1591 and César had been the couple's first child. He was legitimised on 3 February 1595, and was created the first Duke of Vendôme by his father in 1598. In the same year, he was engaged to Françoise de Lorraine, "..the wealthiest heiress in France".

In 1598, César was created Duke of Vendome in his own right. One year later he also inherited the titles of Duke of Beaufort and Duke of Étampes upon the death of his mother, who died as a result of a stillbirth in Paris.

He was his father's first son but due to his illegitimacy, was not allowed to inherit the throne; his half-brother, the future Louis XIII of France was born in September 1601 much to the joy of the king.

On 16 July 1608, at the Château de Fontainebleau, Cesar married Françoise de Lorraine (d. 1669), the wealthy heiress of Philippe Emmanuel, Duke of Mercœur. Françoise was the legal heir to the large and separate duchies of Mercœur and Penthièvre. In 1610, Cesar's father granted him a rank higher than peers of the realm but below princes of the blood (prince du sang).

César was involved in many noble intrigues during the reign of his half-brother Louis XIII of France. Implicated in the conspiracy of Chalais against Cardinal Richelieu, he and his brother Alexandre, the Chevalier de Vendôme, were imprisoned in the Château de Vincennes in 1626. He was released in 1630.

In 1632, he returned to France but was soon accused of plotting the death of Richelieu and was exiled again, first to Holland then to England. He did not return until 1642. Soon after his return he took part in the  against Cardinal Mazarin, together with his second son François - this led to yet another exile, till 1650. The marriage of his son Louis to Laura Mancini brought about his reconciliation with Mazarin, and he supported Anne of Austria throughout the Fronde.

He reconciled with his half-brother in December 1642, a year before his death and the accession of his nephew Louis XIV. The reconciliation occurred after the death of Richelieu.

César led the royal troops against the rebels in Burgundy, of which he was appointed governor in 1650; appointed Grand Admiral of France in 1651 he helped to capture the insurgent stronghold of Bordeaux in July 1653. Joining French forces in the ongoing war with Spain, he defeated a Spanish fleet off Barcelona in 1655.

Early in 1665 the Duke of Vendôme was created the Grand Master of Navigation. He died later that year on 22 October 1665 in Paris and was buried in the chapel of Saint-Georges at the Château of Vendôme.

Issue
Louis de Bourbon, 2nd ''Duke of Vendôme (1612–1669) married Laura Mancini and had issue;
François de Bourbon, 2nd Duke of Beaufort (1616–1669) never married, had issue;
Élisabeth de Bourbon, Mademoiselle de Vendôme (Paris, August 1614 – Paris, 19 May 1664), married in Paris on 11 July 1643 Charles Amédée of Savoy, Duke of Nemours.

References

Sources

|-

1594 births
1665 deaths
16th-century peers of France
17th-century peers of France
Peers created by Henry IV of France
17th-century French military personnel
People from Picardy
House of Bourbon-Vendôme
Dukes of Vendôme
Dukes of Étampes
Dukes of Beaufort (France)
House of Bourbon (France)
Admirals of France
Illegitimate children of Henry IV of France
French prisoners and detainees
Prisoners and detainees of France
French exiles
Military personnel of the Franco-Spanish War (1635–1659)
Sons of kings
Dukes of Mercœur